The Djebba Fergani, or Gandoura is a long velvet dress adorned with elaborate embroidery and it originates from Algeria.

The Djebba Fergani is a traditional Algerian dress that originated in Algeria, more specifically Constantine. It is made from velvet and features elaborate golden embroidery. It is also worn in Tizi Ouzou where it is typically made using cotton.

The colour of this dress is typically black or burgundy made from thick velvet and adorned with golden embroidery. The dress is an old tradition that goes far back in Algerian history.

See also
 Ghlila
 Karakou
 Frimla
 Bniqa

References

Algerian clothing
Embroidery